John Pritchett may refer to:
 John Pritchett (bishop)
 John Pritchett (sound engineer)
 John Pritchett (golfer)
 Johnny Pritchett, English boxer